Karen Michele Dufilho-Rosen (born October 30, 1968) was a producer for Pixar Shorts. She graduated from Scarborough High School in Houston, Texas, United States in 1987. and produced Jan Pinkava's Geri's Game and Ralph Eggleston's For the Birds, which both won Oscars for Best Animated Short Film.

References

Living people
1968 births
American film producers
Pixar people